Sebastián Portigliatti (born 1 March 1985) is an Argentine footballer who plays as goalkeeper for Juticalpa F.C. in the Honduran Liga Nacional.

Honours
Motagua
Honduran Liga Nacional: Apertura 2014–15

References

1985 births
Living people
Footballers from Córdoba, Argentina
Argentine footballers
Association football goalkeepers
Ferro Carril Oeste footballers
San Martín de Mendoza footballers
F.C. Motagua players
Juticalpa F.C. players
Liga Nacional de Fútbol Profesional de Honduras players
Argentine expatriate footballers
Expatriate footballers in Italy
Expatriate footballers in Honduras
Argentine expatriate sportspeople in Honduras